Colegio de la Inmaculada may refer to: 
 Colegio de la Inmaculada (Lima), Lima, Peru.
 Colegio de la Inmaculada (Gijón), Gijón, Spain.
 Colegio de la Inmaculada (Santa Fe), Santa Fe, Argentina.
 Colegio de la Inmaculada Concepcion, Cebu City, Philippines.
 Colegio de la Inmaculada Concepcion de la Concordia, Manila, Philippines. 
 Colegio Inmaculada Concepción, San Fernando, Chile.